Rokitno may refer to the following places:
the Rokitno or Pinsk Marshes, now in Belarus and Ukraine
Rokitno, Biała Podlaska County in Lublin Voivodeship (east Poland)
Rokitno, Lubartów County in Lublin Voivodeship (east Poland)
Rokitno, Tomaszów Lubelski County in Lublin Voivodeship (east Poland)
Rokitno, Masovian Voivodeship (east-central Poland)
Rokitno, Silesian Voivodeship (south Poland)
Rokitno, Międzyrzecz County in Lubusz Voivodeship (west Poland)
Rokitno, Strzelce-Drezdenko County in Lubusz Voivodeship (west Poland)
Rokitno, West Pomeranian Voivodeship (north-west Poland)

See also
 Rokytne (disambiguation)